Turkey generates 28,858,880 tons of solid municipal waste per year; the annual amount of waste generated per capita amounts to 390 kilograms. According to Waste Atlas, Turkey's waste collection coverage rate is 77%, whereas its unsound waste disposal rate is 69%. While the country has a strong legal framework in terms of laying down common provisions for waste management, the implementation process has been considered slow since the beginning of 1990s.

Overview 

Turkey's waste management system is not a priority policy area. The country regardless employs several waste management practices including sanitary landfills, incineration (only for hazardous waste), sterilization, composting, and other advanced disposal methods such as pyrolysis, gasification as well as plasma. The most common method of waste disposal in the country, especially for municipal waste, is landfilling. The municipal waste is collected on a regularly scheduled basis. The metropolitan municipality and other municipalities are responsible for providing collection, transportation, separation, recycling, disposal and storage of waste services.

Turkey uses a diffuse approach to manage waste by distributing duties and powers among many institutions and organizations.

Legal framework 

Waste management in Turkey is subject to numerous environmental laws. The country had only three laws concerning waste between 1983-2003, whereas ten more regulations were introduced between 2003-2008. Most environmental regulations in Turkey are based on Article 56 of the Constitution, which states:

Turkish Law on Environment no.2872 creates the basis of the legal framework for waste management practices in Turkey:

In addition, Law on Amendments in Law on Environment no.5491 (Article 11); Law on Metropolitan Municipalities no.5216 (Article 7); and Municipal Law no.5393 (Article 14 and 15) explain the duties of municipal authorities, whereas Law on Municipal Revenues no. 2464 (Article 97) establishes the polluter-pays principle. Finally, Articles 181 and 182 of the Turkish Penal Code no.5237 (under the section "Crimes Against the Environment") state that intentional pollution of the environment is punishable by law up to five years in prison. The degree of the punishment is decided upon the severity of the pollution and impact on the environment.

Government efforts 
According to the Turkish Ministry of Environment and Urbanization, the management of municipal waste is under the responsibility of municipalities as a regional management approach by the Ministry of Environment and Urbanization. Since 2003, municipalities are implementing municipal waste management projects by cooperating with other municipalities in the region (through the municipalities union). Turkish government drew up a master plan for 2007- 2009 based on the recognition that uncontrolled and unsafe waste disposal is an integral part of daily life in Turkey and poses a serious risk to the environment and to the health of the country's 70 million inhabitants. The number of controlled landfill sites was raised to roughly 3000 - a steep increase on the 90 that existed in the 1990s. As of 2011, there is approximately one sanitary landfill site per municipality.

Ongoing initiatives towards improving the municipal solid waste management in Turkey aimed to set up a waste management system acting in accordance with the related national legislation and EU legislation, covering the establishment of necessary waste treatment facilities (pretreatment facilities and landfills) and transfer stations, reduction of the amount of waste, ensuring recycling and reuse, and reducing the waste transportation costs.

Waste mismanagement practices 
The main question in the field of waste management is not the legal arrangement itself; but the deficiencies in implementing them. While Turkey uses a diffuse approach to manage its waste, the effectiveness of application process has been negatively affected due to repetitions and gaps in sharing roles and responsibilities among different agencies. This situation, coupled with insufficient institutional capacity and weak technical infrastructure, limits the ability of related legislation to direct the implementation. Turkey is also yet to develop a comprehensive and specific national strategic plan on waste management, or on the climate change overall.

Turkstat reported that waste was Turkey's largest source of methane emissions with 58% between 1990-2011. Eurostat data indicates that Turkey did not recycle any of its municipal solid waste between 2001-2010, although poor reporting, not performance, was given as the cause for the absence of data. The Turkish Ministry of Environment and Urbanization reports the total amount of recycled packaging waste in 2009 to be 2.5 million tonnes, and certainly part of this recycled packaging waste is from MSW sources, but the share is unknown. Out of the approximate 30 million tonnes of municipal waste generated in 2010, 25 million tonnes or 84% were collected and about 98% of this collected waste was landfilled either in sanitary landfills (54%) or dumpsites (44%).

As of 2013, Turkey imposes no landfill tax. According to The Turkish Ministry of Environment and Urbanization, EU Landfill Directive (99/31/EC) will be carried out by 2025. In addition, the ministry gave no specific GHG reduction targets in its "Climate Change Action Plan 2011-2023" published in 2012. In the absence of binding international agreements, Turkey is still far from making sound commitments to combat climate change on both national and international level.

Impact of poor waste management 
The biggest problem in terms of waste management in the country stems from uncovered landfills, where the garbage is simply left to rot. In 2009, Turkey's overall greenhouse gas emissions increased about 98% compared to 1990 levels. Turkstat data shows that the country's methane emissions increased by 52% between 1990-2011. According to this data, GHG emissions related to waste alone increased by 120% during the mentioned time period. This downward trend, coupled with the country's positive economic and demographic growth since 1990s, creates numerous problems.

Turkey's waste financing system does not take into consideration the polluter-pays principle sufficiently, so economical tools are weak to deter pollution and financial sources are inadequate for investments. Usage of natural areas (forests, seasides etc.) still causes a great threat to the environment. In addition, insufficient capacity for treatment and disposal of hazardous waste leads to illegal dumping to the nature. Furthermore, recycling rates are poor due to the lack of adequate facilities and incentives in the waste sector. Uncovered landfills remain to be potential sources of flammable biogases, carcinogen and toxic waste, as well as microbial diseases due to the inadequate changes on their status since 1990s. Along with poor funding and reporting, recycling sector in Turkey also suffers from poor environmental consciousness on both public and industrial level.

See also 
 Environmental issues in Turkey

References

External links 
 Republic of Turkey Ministry of Environment and Urbanization

Waste management
Turkey